Rhines is a surname. Notable people with the surname include:

 Billy Rhines (1869–1922), American baseball player
 Charles Rhines (1956–2019), American murderer executed in South Dakota
 Jennifer Rhines (born 1974), American long-distance runner
 Wally Rhines (born 1946), American engineer

See also
 Rhine (disambiguation)